David Vlahov (born August 31, 1952) is an American epidemiologist and professor emeritus at the UCSF School of Nursing, of which he previously served as dean from April 2011 to August 2016. He is also the editor-in-chief of the Journal of Urban Health, and has been a member of the National Academy of Medicine since 2011. He is known for researching issues related to social determinants of health, such as the effectiveness of needle exchange programs. With Sandro Galea, he has also researched psychological responses to the September 11 attacks among residents of New York City.

Biography
Vlahov was born and raised in Washington, D.C. He is the son of William Vlahov, a Queens-born dentist, and Helga Wolfsohn, a Jewish woman who grew up in Hamburg, Germany and fled the country for England on Kristallnacht. He received his B.A. from Earlham College in 1974, his B.S.N. from the University of Maryland in 1977, his M.S. from the University of Maryland in 1980, and his Ph.D. from the Johns Hopkins School of Public Health and Hygiene in 1988. Soon after graduating from the University of Maryland, he worked as a nurse in a coronary unit at Baltimore's Sinai Hospital, and as a clinician in a prison hospital. He later became Director of the Center for Urban Epidemiologic Studies at the New York Academy of Medicine, where he helped build the center's work on subjects such as HIV prevention and mental health. While working at the New York Academy of Medicine, he also conducted a study of psychological reactions to the September 11 attacks. Before joining UCSF in 2011, he also served as a professor of clinical epidemiology at the Joseph L. Mailman School of Public Health, and the senior vice president for research at the New York Academy of Medicine.

Personal life
Vlahov is married to Robyn Gershon, with whom he has two adult children.

References

Living people
American nurses
American epidemiologists
1952 births
University of California, San Francisco faculty
Academic journal editors
Members of the National Academy of Medicine
Academics from Washington, D.C.
Earlham College alumni
University of Maryland, College Park alumni
Johns Hopkins Bloomberg School of Public Health alumni
Columbia University Mailman School of Public Health faculty